Katherine Whyte Grant or Caitrìona Whyte Grannd or Catrìona Nic-’Ille-Bhàin Ghrannd (April 11, 1845 – August 18, 1928) was a Scottish writer and translator of Gaelic and English. Grant was born in Bonawe, in Scotland and died in Oban, Scotland.

Grant's knowledge of traditional Gaelic folklore was passed down to her from her mother and grandmother. Her work was published in Myth, Tradition and Story from Western Argyll (1925) and she was awarded a Civil List Pension in 1914 in recognition of her Gaelic writing.

References 

1845 births
1928 deaths
20th-century Scottish writers
20th-century Scottish women writers
Scottish translators
Scottish folklorists